Paproć  is a village in the administrative district of Gmina Nowy Tomyśl, within Nowy Tomyśl County, Greater Poland Voivodeship, in west-central Poland.

The village has a population of 716.

The Nowy Tomyśl Wind Turbines, two of the tallest in the world, are nearby.

References

Villages in Nowy Tomyśl County